Over United Reformed Church is in Swanlow Lane, Over, Winsford, Cheshire, England. It was built as a Congregational chapel and is now a United Reformed Church. It is a Grade II listed building,

The church was the second to be designed by John Douglas. Building began in 1865 and was completed in 1867. Its exterior is in polychromatic brick, with a slate roof and red sandstone dressings.

It is an unusual building that Douglas' biographer Edward Hubbard describes as being "experimental" and as presenting "an astonishing sight". The architectural historian Nikolaus Pevsner called it "very ugly".

See also

List of new churches by John Douglas
Listed buildings in Winsford

References

Churches completed in 1865
Grade II listed churches in Cheshire
John Douglas buildings
United Reformed churches in England
1865 establishments in England
Winsford